Cable News Network Türk (known as CNN Türk) is a Turkish pay television news channel, launched on 11 October 1999 as the localised variant of American channel CNN. It broadcasts exclusively for Turkey and it is owned by Warner Bros. Discovery and Demirören Group. Its headquarters are in Istanbul.

Controversies

CNN Türk was one of the Turkish news channels which were criticised for not covering the Gezi Park protests. On June 2, 2013 at 1:00am, CNN Türk was broadcasting a documentary on penguins while CNN International was showing live coverage of the protests in Turkey.

"[On the afternoon of Friday, May 31, 2013] CNN Turk was broadcasting a food show, featuring the “flavors of Niğde.” Other major Turkish news channels were showing a dance contest and a roundtable on study-abroad programs. It was a classic case of the revolution not being televised. The whole country seemed to be experiencing a cognitive disconnect, with Twitter saying one thing, the government saying another, and the television off on another planet."

In 2014, it showed a documentary on bees as Turkish Kurds undertook major protests about Ankara's refusal to support Kurdish fighters battling Islamic State in Kobanê.

On 15 July 2016, CNN Turk was forced to shut down by soldiers during the 2016 Turkish coup attempt.

In February 2020, the Republican People's Party (CHP), announced a boycott of CNN Türk. Tuncay Özkan from the CHP alleged that the TV channel acts like a publicity agency for the government of the  Justice and Development Party (AKP). No politicians from the CHP would take part in any debate of CNN Türk and the CHP also advised not to watch CNN Türk at all.

Notable anchors
 Ahmet Hakan Coşkun

References

External links

Official website 
CNN Türk at LyngSat Address
https://twitter.com/cnnturk

Turk
24-hour television news channels in Turkey
Television stations in Turkey
Turkish-language television stations
Television channels and stations established in 1999
Turner Broadcasting System Europe
Doğan Media Group
Mass media in Istanbul
1999 establishments in Turkey